The Spree is, with a length of approximately , the main tributary of the River Havel.  The Spree is much longer than the Havel, which it flows into at Berlin-Spandau; the Havel then flows into the Elbe at Havelberg. The river rises in the Lusatian Highlands, that are part of the Sudetes, in the Lusatian part of Saxony, where it has three sources: the historical one called Spreeborn in the village of Spreedorf, the water-richest one in Neugersdorf, and the highest elevated one in Eibau. The Spree then flows northwards through Upper and Lower Lusatia, where it crosses the border between Saxony and Brandenburg. After passing through Cottbus, it forms the Spree Forest, a large inland delta and biosphere reserve. It then flows through Lake Schwielochsee before entering Berlin, as Müggelspree 

The Spree is the main river of Berlin, Brandenburg, Lusatia, and the settlement area of the Sorbs, who call the River Sprjewja; the name derives ultimately from spreutaną "to spring forth". For a very short distance close to its sources, the Spree constitutes, as Spréva, the border between Germany (Saxony), and the Czech Republic (Bohemia). The Spree's longest tributaries are Dahme (confluence in Berlin-Köpenick) and Schwarzer Schöps (confluence in Sprey), other well-known tributaries (since they are Berlin rivers) are Panke and Wuhle.

Course

It rises in the Lusatian Mountains and flows north through Bautzen and Spremberg.

In the Spreewald the river passes through the towns of Lübbenau, Lübben and Leibsch. Just below Leibsch, the Dahme Flood Relief Canal diverts water from the Spree to run into the River Dahme at Märkisch Buchholz. The Spree continues north from Leibsch before flowing into the Neuendorfer See at the northern edge of the Spreewald. From the Neundorfer See it then flows in an easterly direction to the Schwielochsee, and then in a northerly and westerly direction to the town of Fürstenwalde. From Fürstenwalde the river continues to flow westwards, through the Dämeritzsee and Müggelsee, to Köpenick in the southeastern part of Berlin, where it is joined by its tributary, the River Dahme.

The final reach of the Spree is where it is best known. It flows through the city centre of Berlin to join the River Havel in Spandau, one of Berlin's western boroughs, which itself ultimately merges with the Elbe to enter the sea in Cuxhaven, after flowing through Hamburg. On its route through Berlin, the river passes Berlin Cathedral (Berliner Dom), the Reichstag and the Schloss Charlottenburg. The renowned Museum Island (Museumsinsel), with its collection of five major museums, is an island in the Spree.

In 2004 the Badeschiff floating swimming pool opened on the Spree in Berlin.

Navigation
Small craft, such as punts, are widely used in wetlands of the Spreewald. Larger craft can reach as far upstream as Leibsch, although the upper reaches are relatively shallow and are generally only used by leisure craft. Some intermediate reaches are unnavigable and by-passed by canals.

On this reach, and on the reach west of the confluence with the River Dahme at Köpenick, the river forms part of secondary commercial link between Berlin and the River Oder and hence Poland. The canal diverges from the Spree just east of Fürstenwalde and later joins the River Dahme at the (lake) Seddinsee.

In Berlin, the Spree forms part of a dense network of navigable waterways, many of which are artificial, and which provide a wide choice of routes. Several important commercial harbours can be found on this network, and tugs and barges move sand, grain, bricks, and beer. Tour boats tour the central section of the Spree and its adjoining waterways on a frequent basis.

Berlin Wall

Many people died in the Spree during the Cold War while trying to cross the Berlin Wall, including children who drowned when rescuers were not allowed to enter the river to save them.

Images

References

External links

 Panorama Spree - Panoramic view of the river in Berlin
 

Federal waterways in Germany
International rivers of Europe
Rivers of Berlin
Rivers of Brandenburg
Rivers of Saxony
Rivers of the Ústí nad Labem Region
 
Rivers of Germany
Border rivers
Czech Republic–Germany border